William S. Smith  may refer to:

 William Stephens Smith (1755–1816), United States Representative from New York
 Sir William Sidney Smith (Royal Navy officer), British admiral
 William Saumarez Smith (1836–1909), Australian Anglican archbishop
 William Sooy Smith (1830–1916), American Civil War general
 William Sidney Smith (assemblyman), New York politician
 William S. Smith Jr. (born 1947), former president of the Association of Universities for Research in Astronomy (AURA)

See also
 William Smith (disambiguation)